A Heart That Knows You is a compilation album by Christian singer-songwriter Twila Paris, released in late 1992 by Star Song Records. The album peaked at number four on the Billboard Top Christian Albums chart. A Heart That Knows You is a collection of Paris' radio hits and praise and worship songs from her Star Song catalog featuring two brand new songs, a re-recording of her first number-one hit "The Warrior Is a Child" and a re-recorded medley of "Do I Trust You", "Keepin' My Eyes on You", and "We Will Glorify". The new recordings were produced by Greg Nelson and Paul Mills. In 1993, Paris won her first of three-consecutive Female Vocalist of the Year titles at the GMA Dove Awards. A music video was made for "Destiny" to promote the album.

Track listing 
All songs written by Twila Paris, except where noted.

Note: 
 (*) - tracks produced by Greg Nelson
 (**) - tracks produced by Paul Mills
 (***) - tracks produced by Brown Bannister
 (^) - tracks produced by Jonathan David Brown

Charts

Radio singles

Accolades 
GMA Dove Awards
1993, 1994 Female Vocalist of the Year

References 

1992 compilation albums
Twila Paris albums